Grimpoteuthis bathynectes is a deepwater species of so-called Dumbo octopus first described in 1990. So far only thirteen specimens have been recorded.

Description
Grimpoteuthis bathynectes in general form is distinguished from other Grimpoteuthis species by a suite of characteristics. Each of the dorsal arms have 47–58 suckers, with the suckers slightly larger and more globular in males (more tubular shaped in females). The pairs of cirri (small fingerlike projections between each sucker) start between the 3rd and 4th sucker, and at greatest length the cirri are roughly equal to the sucker diameter. The internal shell (fin support) is roughly 'U'-shaped, its ends being flattened with small spikes. The species also lacks a radula and posterior salivary gland (features found in some Grimpoteuthis), and has 7 to 9 gill lamellae on each gill. For coloration, the mantle and head is grayish, red-brown on posterior edges of fins, the inside of the arm webbing (oral surfaces) are dark purple to reddish brown.

The diet and behavior of this Grimpoteuthis species has not been recorded, but is presumably similar to others of its genus.

Habitat
Grimpoteuthis bathynectes has only been collected from Tufts Abyssal Plain and Cascadia Abyssal Plain, northeastern Pacific Ocean. The species was collected at depths from 2816 to 3932 m.

References

External links
 Video of G. bathynectes in motion

Octopuses
Cephalopods of Oceania
Molluscs of the Pacific Ocean
Molluscs of the Atlantic Ocean
Molluscs described in 1990